Alejandro "Álex" Blanco Olmedo (born 15 October 2001) is a Spanish footballer who plays as an attacking midfielder for CF Fuenlabrada Promesas Madrid 2021.

Club career
Born in Fuenlabrada, Madrid, Blanco represented CD La Avanzada and CF Fuenlabrada as a youth, before making his senior debut with the former's first team during the 2019–20 campaign, in the regional leagues. In 2020, he returned to Fuenla and was assigned to the reserves in the fifth tier.

For the 2021–22 season, Blanco was assigned to Fuenlabrada's new reserve team CF Fuenlabrada Promesas Madrid 2021 in the Tercera División RFEF. He made his first team – and professional – debut on 3 November 2021, starting in a 1–2 away loss against UD Las Palmas in the Segunda División.

References

External links

2001 births
Living people
Spanish footballers
Association football midfielders
Segunda División players
Tercera Federación players
Divisiones Regionales de Fútbol players
CF Fuenlabrada B players
CF Fuenlabrada footballers